Harveya is a genus of parasitic plants in the family Orobanchaceae.  The approximately 40 species included are native to Africa and the Mascarene Islands. In South Africa they are commonly known as '', because early settlers used the flowers to make ink, and this is the source of the English common-names for the genus of ink flower or ink plant.

It was named after William Henry Harvey, thus achieving one of his childhood ambitions. Discussing his vocational prospects as a youth, Harvey wrote that he was "neither fit to be a doctor nor a lawyer, lacking courage for the one, and face for the other, and application for both.... All I have a taste for is natural history, and that might possibly lead in days to come to a genus called Harveya, and the letters F.L.S. after my name, and with that I shall be content."

Species
Harveya capensis (South Africa)
Harveya comorensis (Comoros)
Harveya huttonii (South Africa)
Harveya obtusifolia (Madagascar and Yemen)
Harveya pauciflora (South Africa)
Harveya pulchra (South Africa)
Harveya pumila (South Africa)
Harveya purpurea (South Africa)
Harveya scarlatina (South Africa)
Harveya speciosa (South Africa)
Harveya squamosa (South Africa)
Harveya stenosiphon (South Africa)

References

 
Orobanchaceae genera
Parasitic plants